Zoe Birkett (born 16 June 1985) is an English singer and musical theatre performer.

Birkett was the highest placing female contestant on Pop Idol in 2001 and later appeared on Big Brother. Her first single, Treat Me Like A Lady, was released in 2003 and charted in the UK Top 40.

Since 2009, Birkett has performed in West End theatre. She has performed in Thriller Live, Moulin Rouge! The Musical, The Bodyguard, Priscilla Queen of the Desert and other notable productions.

Career

Early career and Pop Idol
Birkett was born in Consett, a town in County Durham, and began attending stage school when she was just three years old. She had had hopes of being a performer, and trained at the Amanda McGlynn Academy in Middlesbrough and the Lorraine Murray Dance School.

In 2002, Birkett finished fourth on the first series of Pop Idol, behind Will Young, Gareth Gates and Darius Danesh, and being the highest placed female on the show. During the programme, she performed such songs as Whitney Houston's "One Moment in Time", "I Will Always Love You" and "I Wanna Dance with Somebody (Who Loves Me)"; Aretha Franklin's "I Say a Little Prayer"; ABBA's "Thank You For the Music" and Judy Garland's "Get Happy". After the show, Birkett was the warm-up act on Pop Idol winners Will Young's and Gareth Gates' tour where she performed to over 250,000 people. She performed three songs for the triple platinum Pop Idol: The Big Band Album, which charted at number 1 in the UK Albums Chart.

Record deal and theatre career
In 2003, Birkett signed a recording contract with 19 Recordings and released one single, "Treat Me Like a Lady", in January 2003. The track was co-written by fellow Pop Idol contestant Sarah Whatmore and peaked at number 12 in the UK Singles Chart. Birkett later departed from her record label and pursued an alternative career in musical theatre . Her first roles were in pantomime and touring productions such as In Town Tonight, What A Feeling, West End Rocks and Cover Girls.

In 2009, Birkett was cast in West End theatre and performed in Priscilla Queen of the Desert until 2011. Birkett was later cast as lead singer in Garrick Theatre's 2011 production of Respect La Diva, and became the leading lady of Thriller Live in 2012.

Other castings include being the understudy for The Bodyguard's leading lady Alexandra Burke where she was responsible for matinée performances.. Since 2021, Birkett has performed as Arabia in Moulin Rouge! The Musical at Piccadilly Theatre. She is the main female lead role of Satine, which she debuted on May 10, 2022.

Big Brother
On 14 July 2014, Birkett entered the Big Brother house as one of three new housemates alongside Biannca Lake and Pavandeep "Pav" Paul. Upon their arrival, the three new housemates were informed that they would have the power to evict one of the existing housemates, but were unaware that the public would also be deciding which of them would be allowed to stay in the house. On 18 July, Birkett was saved from eviction, having received the most votes from the public. She and Pav then voted to evict Danielle McMahon from the house. On Day 58, she was evicted from the Big Brother House.

References

1985 births
Living people
English stage actresses
Pop Idol contestants
19 Recordings artists
Big Brother (British TV series) contestants
People from Consett
English people of Maltese descent
21st-century English women singers
21st-century English singers